Port Island or Chek Chau is an island of Hong Kong, under the administration of Tai Po District. It is located in Tolo Channel, in the northeastern New Territories. Its name literally means red island; after the sedimentary rocks rich in iron that form this island. and volcanoes

Port Island has been designated as a Site of Special Scientific Interest since 1979.

See also

 Hong Kong National Geopark
 List of islands and peninsulas of Hong Kong

References

External links

 Danxia wonder at sea － Port Island

Uninhabited islands of Hong Kong
Tai Po District
Hong Kong UNESCO Global Geopark
Underwater diving sites in Hong Kong
Islands of Hong Kong